Oosthem is a village in Súdwest-Fryslân in the province of Friesland, the Netherlands. It had a population of around 420 in January 2017.

History
The village was first mentioned in 1453 as Aesthem. The etymology is unclear. Oosthem is a terp (artificial living hill) village near the former Middelzee which is located to north of IJlst.

The Dutch Reformed church was built in 1860 in neoclassical style as a replacement of its medieval predecessor.

Oosthem was home to 180 people in 1840. Before 2011, the village was part of the Wymbritseradiel municipality.

Gallery

References

External links

Súdwest-Fryslân
Populated places in Friesland